Lintneria porioni is a moth of the  family Sphingidae. It is known from Peru.

The wingspan is about 110  mm. The forewing upperside is dark grey, with conspicuous, strongly contrasting white markings and two white streaks, parallel to the veins. There is also a thin, white submarginal line parallel and very close to the outer margin and a white subbasal patch and white chevron distal to it along the hind margin.

There is probably one generation per year with adults recorded from late June to early August. Specimens have been taken at Balsas in early November.

The larvae probably feed on Lamiaceae (such as Salvia, Mentha, Monarda and Hyptis), Hydrophylloideae (such as Wigandia) and Verbenaceae species (such as Verbena and Lantana).

References

Lintneria
Moths described in 1995